The House of Julia Felix, also referred to as the praedia (Latin for an estate, or land) of Julia Felix, is a large Roman property on the Via dell'Abbondanza in the city of Pompeii. It was originally the residence of Julia Felix, who converted portions of it to apartments available for rent and other parts for public use after the major earthquake in 62 AD, a precursor to the eruption of Mount Vesuvius in 79 AD that destroyed Pompeii.

Archaeological excavations began in 1755 and the remains of the House of Julia Felix can be visited today.

Background

Julia Felix's property took up an entire insula, or block of land, at the height of her ownership and business. After the 62 AD earthquake, she converted it into luxurious baths and leisure gardens for public use, as well as apartments for rent.

Scholars disagree on Julia Felix's upbringing and the ways in which she inherited the money needed to create a villa; some believe Julia Felix was a "low-born, illegitimate daughter of Spurius", others believe she was descended from imperial freedmen. Renting out her villa established herself as a property owner, businesswoman, and public figure in Pompeii. During Julia Felix's lifetime, laws were implemented limiting women from owning property without a male figure or guardian. Some Roman women were able to own land and other types of property if they were independent of their fathers, husbands, or male guardians. If legal guardians were required, they would have to approve actions involving the transferring of women's property. Elite women were able to bypass the need for a guardian in property ownership and property transfer.

Architecture

The House of Julia Felix was a combination of indoor and outdoor areas built around atria, courtyards into which the main rooms opened, with enclosed gardens and private water supply; Sections of the praedia allowed for indoor and outdoor seating with frescoes depicting landscapes of leisure and gardens.

The sumptuousness of the architecture and the quality of the decoration indicate that the praedia were intended for richer and higher status customers.

Inside the villa 

The walls are still almost completely covered with frescoes. The tablinum facing onto the large garden to the east must have been spectacular with its particularly fine paintings, Fourth-Style frescoes consisting of dados painted with green plants on a black background, a central zone of red and yellow panels with villas, sanctuaries and flying figures with a set of Apollo and the Muses and another with a frieze of still-life panels.

The frescoes within the House of Julia Felix often depicted small-time merchants and the lifestyles of every day Pompeian citizens.

The summer triclinium and baths were some of the most extravagant aspects of the house used by the tenants. The dining room was elegant and welcoming and like those of the wealthiest citizens of Pompeii who owned villas in the countryside and on the coast and overlooked the gardens that incorporated small pools and waterfalls.

The fully equipped and elegant baths were intended for only respectable citizens of Pompeii. They must have been well-used, since most of the public baths in Pompeii were closed for repairs after the damage caused by in the earthquake of AD 62.

In the large garden at the rear, fruit trees were enclosed in large squares formed by low wooden fences.

Excavations
The earliest known excavation was in 1755 under the direction of R.J de Alcubierre and his assistant K. Weber and was essentially treasure hunting, focussed on recovering valuable objects and paintings for the  collection of the Bourbon royal family at Portici. The first skeleton of Pompeii was found here in 1748.

The building was then reburied. Fortunately Weber drew a plan of the building, labelling where objects or paintings had been removed, which is priceless for reconstructing today the details of the decoration. Parts of the villa revealed during the first excavation were a taberna, luxurious baths, and richly decorated formal garden dining rooms.

Another excavation during 1912–1935 uncovered a shrine and the façade of the building, the side facing the Via dell'Abbondanza. Between 1998–1999 some of the most important discoveries were made; a nymphaeum or grotto of nymphs with a water-stair fountain and triclinium was a modification after the earthquake of 62 AD.

References

J